USS Shearwater is a name used more than once by the United States Navy:

 , a steel schooner-rigged yacht, built in 1887 by Hawthorne and Co. at Leith, Scotland, and purchased by the Navy on 9 May 1889.
 USS Shearwater (AM-413) was laid down in 1945; however, the conclusion of World War II prompted the cancellation of her construction.
 , served with the Military Sea Transportation Service in May 1964. Operated by a Civil Service crew, she operated in the Atlantic Ocean until mid-February 1969, when she was transferred to the United States Army.

References 

United States Navy ship names